Médée is a French language opéra-comique by Luigi Cherubini. The libretto by François-Benoît Hoffman (Nicolas Étienne Framéry) was based on Euripides' tragedy of Medea and Pierre Corneille's play Médée. It is set in the ancient city of Corinth.

The opera was premiered on 13 March 1797 at the Théâtre Feydeau, Paris. It met with a lukewarm reception and was not immediately revived.  During the twentieth century, it was usually performed in Italian translation as Medea, with the spoken dialogue replaced by recitatives not authorized by the composer.  More recently, opera companies have returned to Cherubini's original version.

The long-lost final aria, which Cherubini appears to have elided from his original manuscript, was discovered by researchers from the University of Manchester and Stanford University by employing x-ray techniques to reveal the blackened out areas of Cherubini's manuscript.

Performances and versions

Several versions of the opera were produced and staged in Italian and German:
 1800: German translation by Karl Alexander Herklots was premiered in Berlin on 17 February 1800
 1802: Another German translation by Georg Friedrich Treitschke was premiered in Vienna on 6 November 1802.
 1809: The shortened version of the Treitschke translation was given in Vienna, where Cherubini produced a version which omitted some 500 bars of music
 1855: Franz Lachner's German version was given in Frankfurt.  This was based on the shortened Vienna version, but with recitatives composed by Lachner which replaced the spoken dialogue.
 1865: The United Kingdom premiere was given in Italian at Her Majesty's Theatre on 6 June, with recitatives by Luigi Arditi, and Thérèse Tietjens in the title role. Cherubini's son and grandson were among the audience. This performance received a highly enthusiastic review in The Times. 

 1909: The Italian translation of the Lachner version by Carlo Zangarini was prepared for its Italian premiere at the Teatro alla Scala, on 30 December 1909, and starred Ester Mazzoleni.  It was this hybrid version that was revived in 1953 for Maria Callas.

Callas revivals (1953–1962)
Perhaps the most famous 20th-century revival of the work was in Florence in 1953, with Maria Callas in the title role, conducted by Vittorio Gui.  Callas learned and performed the role within a week, to critical acclaim.  The production was so successful that the Teatro alla Scala decided to stage this opera during the opening week of its 1953–1954 season, with Leonard Bernstein filling in for an indisposed Victor de Sabata and staged by Margherita Wallmann.

Callas performed the role throughout the 1950s and early 1960s, with possibly the most famous production being by the Dallas Opera in 1958, conducted by Nicola Rescigno (with Jon Vickers as Jason and Teresa Berganza as Néris) and directed by the Greek director Alexis Minotis.  This production traveled to the Royal Opera House, Covent Garden, in London in 1959, in the Ancient Theatre of Epidaurus in 1961 with the collaboration of the Greek National Opera and to La Scala (where a few minutes of it were filmed) in 1961–62.  It was in these performances that Callas made her last appearances in Italy.

The Rescigno–Minotis production was successfully revived again for Magda Olivero in Dallas (1967) and Kansas City (1968).

Late 20th-century revivals
 1984–1995: Revivals of the original French version were given at the Buxton Festival on 28 July 1984; at The Royal Opera House, Covent Garden on 6 November 1989; and at the Valle d'Itria Festival on 4 August 1995.
 1996: The shortened Vienna version was given in an English translation and sung in English by Opera North in Leeds in April 1996.
 March 1997: A Bicentennial production by Opera Quotannis presented an unabridged (text and music) version (with a period-instrument orchestra) of the original opéra-comique at Alice Tully Hall, Lincoln Center, commemorating the bicentennial of the premiere.  Bart Folse conducted Brian Morgan's stylized production, which featured Phyllis Treigle (in the title role), Carl Halvorson (as Jason), D'Anna Fortunato (as Néris), David Arnold (as Créon), Thaïs St Julien (as Dircé), and Jayne West and Andrea Matthews (as the Handmaidens of Dircé).  Peter G. Davis, in New York magazine, wrote that "Opera Quotannis delivers Cherubini's Médée in all its original glory....  The occasion proved that the real Médée is indeed a masterpiece.  Its weak sister, the doctored Medea we've been hearing all these years, should now be permanently set aside."  Newport Classic subsequently recorded the production for Compact Disc.

The role of Médée is famed for its difficulty. Other famous interpreters of the role in the 20th century included Dame Josephine Barstow, Montserrat Caballé, Eileen Farrell, Marisa Galvany, Leyla Gencer, Dame Gwyneth Jones, Nadja Michael, Maralin Niska, Leonie Rysanek, Sylvia Sass, Anja Silja, Dunja Vejzovic, and Shirley Verrett. Anna Caterina Antonacci performed the Italian version in the first decade of the 21st century: the recording of a performance from the 2008 Turin edition has been released on DVD. The opera, in its Italian version, was performed for the first time at the Metropolitan Opera in 2022, with Sondra Radvanovsky, Matthew Polenzani, Janai Brugger, Michele Pertusi, and Ekaterina Gubanova.  It was featured on the Metropolitan Opera Live in HD on Saturday, October 22, 2022 and an encore showing took place on Wednesday, October 26, 2022.

Roles

Synopsis
Place:  Corinth
Time:  Antiquity

Act 1
Outside the palace of King Créon

Dircé is preparing for her wedding to Jason.  Years ago, Jason had stolen the golden fleece with the help of Médée, who had betrayed her family and established a relationship with Jason, the result of which was two children. Although Jason has since abandoned Médée, she reappears and demands that he return to her. Jason refuses and Médée curses him, swearing vengeance.

Act 2
Inside the palace

In despair, Médée is encouraged by her slave, Néris, to leave the city. Créon then appears and orders that Médée leave. She asks for one more day with her children and, after the king agrees, she appears to be calmer and gives Néris two wedding presents to take to her rival.

Act 3
Between the palace and the temple

Néris brings the two children out to where Médée is waiting.  Sounds of lamentation are heard from within the palace and it is discovered that one of Médée's wedding presents has poisoned Dircé. An angry crowd gathers and Néris, Médée, and the children take refuge in the temple. From the temple, the two women reappear with Médée grasping a blood-stained knife with which she has killed her two children. Médée curses Jason and disappears into the air. The temple goes up in flames and the crowd flees in terror.

Recordings
Original French version:

Italian translation, with recitatives by Franz Lachner:

Influence
Ludwig van Beethoven esteemed Cherubini, and owned a copy of the score of Médée; themes from Beethoven's Pathétique Sonata have a strong likeness to figures and ideas in the opera.

References

External links
 French libretto of Cherubini's Médée
 "Motherhood and Murder: Cherubini's Medea" on npr.org
 Tsippi Fleischer: Luigi Cherubini's Médée (1797): A Study of its Musical and Dramatic Style (including historical sources). UMI Company Microform 9817686. Ann Arbor, MI (USA), 1998. Full PDF text available for download from the author's website.

1797 operas
French-language operas
Operas
Operas based on Medea (Euripides play)
Operas based on plays
Operas based on works by Pierre Corneille
Operas by Luigi Cherubini
Opéras comiques
Works about the Argonauts